The Saurer 5 DUK is a bus of the Swiss manufacturer  Adolph Saurer AG, from  Arbon.

History and development
The Saurer  5 DUK is a left-steered bus and PostBus type of the former PTT operations and various regional bus / transport companies in Switzerland.  DUK stands for Diesel-Unterflur-Kompressor (diesel underfloor compressor). At the post office, these Saurer 5 DUKs were used as postbus busses or as postbus busses with a single axle luggage trailer. The Saurer 5 DUK was built from 1953 on. 

It has a driver's seat, 39 passenger seats, 33 standing places and a luggage compartment. The luggage compartment is directly behind the rear exit door and has a partition with sliding door with glass panes. There are also seats in the luggage compartment. The passenger compartment is divided in the middle by a partition with a door, because in the past the rear part of the bus was designed as a smoking compartment. With the prohibition of smoking in  public buses only the doors of the smoking compartment were removed, and the rest of the partition remained. For PTT operations, these Saurer 5 DUKs were used as single postbus busses, or as postbus busses with a single axle luggage trailer.

In the Zugerland transport companies ZVB  (German: Zugerland Verkehrsbetrieben), these buses were mainly used on the mountain lines Zug-Ägeri (line 1) and Zug-Menzingen (line 2).

The ZVB buses were also equipped with split dispenser in front of the rear wheels in order to achieve better grip on snow and ice. These are used as pure buses, as buses with the passenger trailer APE 4.80 or with the passenger trailer APE 4.80 and the luggage trailer AGP 3. These trailer were used also  by the successor model, the FBW 91U EU4A.

Without a trailer, a maximum speed of up to 120 km/h would have been possible.

By 1975/76, the Saurer 5 DUK was replaced by more modern vehicles such as the FBW 91U EU4A bus with Hess superstructures.

With the purchase in 1975, together with the orange buses, which were held in VST unit paintwork, additional new ordered APE 4.80 trailers got also the orange paintwork and not the blue one like the Saurer 5 DUK and the older APE 4.80.

Some Saurer 5 DUK were sold to Eastern European countries. 

A Saurer 5 DUK of the ZVB is located in the Zug depot technology history (German: Zuger Depot Technikgeschichte).

Data

Gallery

References

Zuger Depot Technikgeschichte
Sandro Sigrist: Elektrische Strassenbahnen im Kanton Zug. Prellbock, Leissigen 1997, 

Articulated buses
Full-size buses
Transport in the canton of Zug